Werner Bruno Wilhelm Hermann Stock (20 October 1903 – 30 April 1972) was a German actor. He appeared in more than 130 films and television shows between 1932 and 1971.

Selected filmography

 Spoiling the Game (1932)
 Decoy (1934)
 The Royal Waltz (1935)
 The Court Concert (1936)
 Paul and Pauline (1936)
 Hilde and the Volkswagen (1936)
 Land of Love (1937)
 Men Without a Fatherland (1937)
 Tango Notturno (1937)
 Madame Bovary (1937)
 A Prussian Love Story (1938)
 Dance on the Volcano (1938)
 The Girl at the Reception (1940)
 The Swedish Nightingale (1941)
 Clarissa (1941)
 Two in a Big City (1942)
 Melody of a Great City (1943)
 The Buchholz Family (1944)
 Marriage of Affection (1944)
 Peter Voss, Thief of Millions (1946)
 The Court Concert (1948)
 The Beautiful Galatea (1950)
 Torreani (1951)
 When the Heath Dreams at Night (1952)
 Christina (1953)
 Everything for Father (1953)
 The Silent Angel (1954)
 As Long as You Live (1955)
 The Dark Star (1955)
 The Rose of Stamboul (1953)
 The Wishing-Table (1956)
 The Glass Tower (1957)
 Freddy, the Guitar and the Sea (1959)
 Rommel Calls Cairo (1959)
 Freddy and the Melody of the Night (1960)
 We Will Never Part (1960)
 Twenty Girls and the Teachers (1971)

References

External links

1903 births
1972 deaths
People from Sangerhausen
German male film actors
German male television actors
20th-century German male actors